Vitaly Dyrdyra (born November 4, 1938 in Cherkasy Oblast, Ukraine) is a sailor and Olympic champion for the Soviet Union.

He won a gold medal in the Tempest Class at the 1972 Summer Olympics in Munich, together with Valentin Mankin.

References

External links
 
 
 

1938 births
Living people
Soviet male sailors (sport)
Ukrainian male sailors (sport)
Olympic sailors of the Soviet Union
Sailors at the 1972 Summer Olympics – Tempest
Olympic gold medalists for the Soviet Union
Olympic medalists in sailing
Medalists at the 1972 Summer Olympics
Honoured Masters of Sport of the USSR
Sportspeople from Cherkasy Oblast